Journal of Biotechnology is a peer-reviewed scientific journal covering research ranging from genetic and molecular biological positions to biochemical, chemical, or bioprocess engineering aspects as well as research on the computer application of new software concepts which are directly relevant to biotechnology.

Abstracting and indexing 
The journal is abstracted and indexed in BIOSIS, Cambridge Scientific Abstracts, Chemical Abstracts, Current Contents/Agriculture, Biology & Environmental Sciences, EMBASE, EMBiology, MEDLINE, and Scopus.

External links 
 

Elsevier academic journals
Biotechnology journals
English-language journals
Publications established in 1984
Semi-monthly journals